Nodaway Township is a township in Nodaway County, in the U.S. state of Missouri.

Nodaway Township was erected in 1871 and named after the Nodaway River.

References

Townships in Missouri
Townships in Nodaway County, Missouri